Baga, or Barka, is a dialect cluster spoken by the Baga people of coastal Guinea. The name derives from the phrase bae raka 'people of the seaside'. Most Baga are bilingual in the Mande language Susu, the official regional language. Two ethnically Baga communities, Sobané and Kaloum, are known to have abandoned their (unattested) language altogether in favour of Susu.

Varieties
The varieties as distinct enough to sometimes be considered different languages. They are:
Baga Koga (Koba)
Baga Manduri (Maduri, Mandari)
Baga Sitemu (Sitem, Sitemú, Stem Baga, Rio Pongo Baga)

The extinct Baga Kaloum and Baga Sobané peoples had spoken Koga and Sitemu, respectively.

Neighboring Baga Pokur is not closely related.

Geographical distribution
Geographical distribution of Baga varieties, listed from north to south, according to Fields-Black (2008:85):

Baga Mandori: coast of Guinea, north of the mouth of the Nunez River
Baga Sitem: coast of Guinea, south of the mouth of the Nunez River
Baga Kakissa: coast of Guinea, north of the mouth of the Pongo River
Baga Koba: coast of Guinea, from south of the mouth of the Pongo River to north of the mouth of the Konkouré River
Baga Kalum: Îles de Los and area surrounding Conakry

Geographical distribution and demographics of Baga varieties according to Wilson (2007), citing a 1997 colloquium talk at Lille by Erhard Voeltz:

Baga Manduri: spoken at Dobale, and very similar to Citɛm.
Baga Sitemu (properly Citɛm): spoken in a cluster of villages on the Campaces River. This is the only vibrant Baga linguistic variety.
Baga Sobane: only two known speakers in an isolated location.
Baga Marara: spoken on three islands in the Rio Pongo. It is still being spoken by children.
Baga Koba: spoken near Kaporo town only by elderly speakers over age 60. It is reportedly very similar to Baga Kaloum.
Baga Kaloum: originally spoken in a quarter of what is now the Conakry area, and in the Îles de Los. It is close to Temne. Only spoken in a remote area now.

Noun Class Systems
Baga has prefixes for eight noun classes:

Vocabulary

Below is a selection of basic vocabulary in Baga Maduri:
  - dog
  - dogs
  - fish
  - pig
  - earth, land
  - the chief's head
  - the cow's head
  - eye
  - tooth
  - teeth
  - hang
  - hand, arm
  - hands, arms
  - hair
  - drink
  - iron
  - turn onto front

References

Further reading
Houis, Maurice (1952) 'Remarques sur la voix passive en Baga', Notes Africaines, 91–92.
Houis, Maurice (1953) 'Le système pronominal et les classes dans les dialectes Baga, i carte', Bulletin de l'IFAN, 15, 381–404.
Mouser, Bruce L. (2002) 'Who and where were the Baga?: European perceptions from 1793 to 1821', History in Africa, 29, 337–364.

External links 
 Link to ELAR documentation of Baga Madori

Languages of Guinea
Baga languages